Jeff Brown and Scott Melville were the defending champions but were forced to withdraw before the final against Petr Korda and Wally Masur.

Seeds
Champion seeds are indicated in bold text while text in italics indicates the round in which those seeds were eliminated. The top four seeded teams received byes into the second round.

Draw

Final

Top half

Bottom half

References

External links
 ITF tournament edition details

Doubles